Michael Burton Brown (born March 5, 1970) is an American basketball coach who is the head coach for the Sacramento Kings of the National Basketball Association (NBA). Brown was previously the head coach of the Cleveland Cavaliers,  the Los Angeles Lakers, and most recently an assistant coach for the Golden State Warriors. He is also the head coach of the Nigerian national team.

Brown began coaching the Cleveland Cavaliers in 2005. The team reached the 2007 NBA Finals, where they were swept by the San Antonio Spurs. Brown was honored as NBA Coach of the Year for leading the Cavaliers to a team-record and league-best 66 wins in 2009. The Cavaliers won 61 games, again a league-best, in 2010. However, after the Cavaliers lost to the Boston Celtics in the 2010 Eastern Conference Semifinals, Brown was fired.

Brown succeeded Phil Jackson as the head coach of the Los Angeles Lakers in 2011 before being fired after the start of the 2012–13 season. He returned to the Cavaliers in 2013, but was fired after the 2013–14 season. Brown then joined the Golden State Warriors as associate head coach in 2016; the team went on to defeat the Cavaliers in the 2017 and 2018 NBA Finals, and the Boston Celtics in the 2022 NBA Finals.

Early years
Brown was born in Columbus, Ohio, but spent periods of his childhood overseas. He graduated in 1988 from Würzburg American High School in Würzburg, Germany, where he excelled in basketball and football. After studying and playing basketball for two years at Mesa Community College, Brown went on to the University of San Diego, where he played two seasons of college basketball for the San Diego Toreros and graduated in 1992 with a Bachelor of Business Administration degree.

Professional career

San Antonio Spurs
In 2000, Brown was hired by Gregg Popovich as an assistant coach with the San Antonio Spurs. He also was the head coach for the Spurs' summer league teams in Boston and Salt Lake City. The Spurs won an NBA championship in 2003 while Brown was on their coaching staff.

Indiana Pacers
In 2003, Brown was hired as associate head coach under Rick Carlisle with the Indiana Pacers. He helped lead Indiana to consecutive playoff appearances, including a trip to the Eastern Conference Finals in 2004. Brown followed Ron Artest into the stands and was instrumental in getting him back to the locker room during the massive brawl between the Pacers, Detroit Pistons, and Pistons fans at the Palace at Auburn Hills on November 19, 2004. Brown remained with the Pacers for two seasons.

Cleveland Cavaliers
In June 2005, Brown replaced Brendan Malone as head coach of the Cleveland Cavaliers. It was his first NBA head coaching position. Brown became the second-youngest coach in the league (trailing only Lawrence Frank). When Brown arrived in Cleveland, the Cavs had missed the playoffs in emerging superstar LeBron James's first two NBA seasons and had not made the playoffs since 1998. Under Brown, they won 50 games, made the 2005–06 playoffs, and won their first-round series.

On June 2, 2007, Brown's Cavaliers defeated the Detroit Pistons in the Eastern Conference Finals and advanced to the NBA Finals for the first time in franchise history. However, they were swept in four games by his former team, the San Antonio Spurs.

On February 1, 2008, Brown was named the Eastern Conference Coach of the Month for January 2008. In 2009, Brown was named coach of the Eastern Conference All-Star team. On April 20, 2009, Brown was named NBA Coach of the Year after guiding the Cavaliers to a league-high and franchise-best 66–16 record.

The Cavs won a league-high 61 games in the 2009–10 season. However, the team was eliminated by the Boston Celtics in the Eastern Conference Semifinals on May 13, 2010. With this loss, the Cavaliers became the first team in NBA history to win 60 games in back-to-back seasons without advancing to the NBA Finals. Brown was fired on May 24, 2010, due to the owner Dan Gilbert wanting to lure LeBron James back to Cleveland. Under Brown's leadership, the Cavs made it past the first round of the NBA playoffs for five consecutive seasons.

Los Angeles Lakers
On May 25, 2011, Brown agreed to succeed Phil Jackson as head coach of the Los Angeles Lakers. He reportedly agreed to a three-year deal with a team option to renew his contract for a fourth year. On May 31, 2011, he was officially named the Lakers' new head coach. The 2011–12 season was shortened to 66 games by the lockout that season, and the Lakers were eliminated in the second round of the playoffs.

Before the 2012–13 season, Brown decided that the Lakers would use a version of the Princeton offense. Shortly afterward, the Lakers acquired All-Stars Steve Nash and Dwight Howard, giving them a starting lineup of five former All-Stars with a combined 33 All-Star game appearances (the other former All-Stars were Kobe Bryant, Pau Gasol, and Metta World Peace, respectively). Although immediately considered top title contenders, the Lakers struggled to adjust to the changes in both system and personnel, and were winless in eight preseason games. The team's travails continued into the start of the regular season, with the team losing four of its first five games. Nash had played just  games due to injury, Howard was playing but recovering from back surgery, and Bryant had been playing with an injured foot and was unable to practice. On November 9, 2012, Brown was fired. The Lakers felt an urgency to win given their aging stars, Howard's pending free agency, and owner Jerry Buss's deteriorating health. Brown's dismissal after five games was the third-fastest coaching change in NBA history.

Cleveland Cavaliers (second stint)
On April 24, 2013, Brown was rehired by the Cavaliers, replacing Byron Scott as head coach. Cavaliers owner Dan Gilbert said that firing Brown the first time was a "mistake". For the first time as a head coach, Brown's team posted a losing record over an 82-game season as his team was marred by injuries and reported infighting in the locker room. On May 12, 2014, he was fired by Gilbert a second time.

Golden State Warriors
On July 4, 2016, the Golden State Warriors hired Brown as an assistant coach; he replaced Luke Walton, who departed for a head coaching position with the Los Angeles Lakers. Brown acted as acting head coach during periods in which head coach Steve Kerr was unable to do so due to chronic back pain. Brown led the Warriors to a 12–0 record in the 2016–17 NBA playoffs while Kerr was absent; the Warriors went on to win the championship in five games that year, defeating the Cleveland Cavaliers. The Warriors finished the playoffs with a 16–1 record, the best postseason winning percentage in NBA history. The Warriors went back to the Finals in 2018 and defeated the Cleveland Cavaliers in the Finals for the second straight year. During these two finals he faced off against LeBron James whom he had coached for five years in Cleveland.

On May 9, 2022, he was the Warriors' acting head coach for Game 4 of the Western Conference semifinals against the Memphis Grizzlies after Kerr tested positive for COVID-19. The team won the game to take a 3–1 lead in the series. The Warriors made it to the 2022 NBA Finals where they defeated the Boston Celtics in six games to give Brown his fourth NBA championship as an assistant coach and third championship with the Warriors overall.

Sacramento Kings
On May 9, 2022, Brown was announced as the next head coach of the Sacramento Kings. His tenure with the team began after the Warriors finished their 2021–22 season where they won an NBA championship.

National team career
On February 5, 2020, he was announced as the new head coach of Nigerian national team.

Head coaching record

|-
| style="text-align:left;"|Cleveland
| style="text-align:left;"|
| 82||50||32|||| style="text-align:center;"|2nd in Central||13||7||6||.538
| style="text-align:center;"|Lost in Conference Semifinals
|-
| style="text-align:left;"|Cleveland
| style="text-align:left;"|
| 82||50||32|||| style="text-align:center;"|2nd in Central||20||12||8||.600
| style="text-align:center;"|Lost in NBA Finals
|-
| style="text-align:left;"|Cleveland
| style="text-align:left;"|
| 82||45||37|||| style="text-align:center;"|2nd in Central||13||7||6||.538
| style="text-align:center;"|Lost in Conference Semifinals
|-
| style="text-align:left;"|Cleveland
| style="text-align:left;"|
| 82||66||16|||| style="text-align:center;"|1st in Central||14||10||4||.714
| style="text-align:center;"|Lost in Conference Finals
|-
| style="text-align:left;"|Cleveland
| style="text-align:left;"|
| 82||61||21|||| style="text-align:center;"|1st in Central||11||6||5||.545
| style="text-align:center;"|Lost in Conference Semifinals
|-
| style="text-align:left;"|L.A. Lakers
| style="text-align:left;"|
| 66||41||25|||| style="text-align:center;"|1st in Pacific||12||5||7||.417
| style="text-align:center;"|Lost in Conference Semifinals
|-
| style="text-align:left;"|L.A. Lakers
| style="text-align:left;"|
| 5||1||4|||| style="text-align:center;"|(fired)||—||—||—||—
| style="text-align:center;"|—
|-
| style="text-align:left;"|Cleveland
| style="text-align:left;"|
| 82||33||49|||| style="text-align:center;"|3rd in Central||—||—||—||—
| style="text-align:center;"|Missed playoffs
|- class="sortbottom"
| colspan=2" style="text-align:center;"|Career
| 563||347||216|||| ||83||47||36||||

References

External links

1970 births
Living people
African-American basketball coaches
African-American basketball players
American expatriate basketball people in Germany
American men's basketball coaches
American men's basketball players
Basketball coaches from Ohio
Basketball players from Columbus, Ohio
Cleveland Cavaliers head coaches
Golden State Warriors assistant coaches
Indiana Pacers assistant coaches
Mesa Thunderbirds men's basketball players
Los Angeles Lakers head coaches
National Basketball Association broadcasters
Nigerian Olympic coaches
San Antonio Spurs assistant coaches
San Diego Toreros men's basketball players
Sportspeople from Columbus, Ohio
Washington Wizards assistant coaches
21st-century African-American sportspeople
20th-century African-American sportspeople